Runnisaidpur Assembly constituency is an assembly constituency in Sitamarhi district in the Indian state of Bihar.

Overview
As per Delimitation of Parliamentary and Assembly constituencies Order, 2008, 29. Runnisaidpur Assembly constituency is composed of the following: Runni Saidpur community development block;  Gaura, Mohini, Pandaul Buzurg, Bath Asli and Kauria Raipur gram panchayats of Nanpur CD Block.

Runnisaidpur Assembly constituency is part of 5. Sitamarhi (Lok Sabha constituency).

Members of Legislative Assembly

Election results

2020

References

External links
 

Assembly constituencies of Bihar
Politics of Sitamarhi district